Delight was an English sailing ship that ran aground off Sable Island, while she was on Sir Humphrey Gilbert's expedition with  to Newfoundland in North America.

Expedition to Newfoundland and sinking 
Delight and  left England in 1583 to take part in Sir Humphrey Gilbert's expedition to Newfoundland.

After reaching Sable Island Delights captain Richard Clarke had a dispute with Sir Humphrey Gilbert to provide a safe passage near the island, but eventually captain Clarke followed Sir Gilbert's orders to pass close to the island.

At 7 am on 29 August 1583 Delight sank after running aground on one of Sable Island's sandbars. Captain Clarke quickly led 16 men to a small lifeboat (which had only one oar) and rowed clear of the fast sinking ship. The water was too shallow for Gilbert's frigate (HMS Squirrel) to offer any assistance.

The 17 men in the lifeboat spent seven days at sea before they finally reached Newfoundland. They were rescued by a barque whaling vessel after spending five days in Newfoundland.

The wreck was one of many on Gilbert's expedition which ended up with Gilbert himself being drowned in a later wreck (the one of Squirrel). The disaster contributed to the temporary abandonment of the English settlement in Newfoundland.

Delight is the first recorded shipwreck off Sable Island.

Wreck 
The wreck lies approximately 10 metres deep near Sable Island.

References

16th-century ships
Ships built in England
Sailing ships of England
Shipwrecks of Canada
History of Nova Scotia
16th century in Canada
Shipwrecks of the Nova Scotia coast
Sable Island
Ships of the English navy